A filmography is a list of films related by some criteria.  For example, an actor's career filmography is the list of films they have appeared in; a director's comedy filmography is the list of comedy films directed by a particular director.  The term, which has been in use since at least 1957, is modeled on and analogous to "bibliography", a list of books. As lists filmographies are distinct from the cinematic arts of "videography" and "cinematography" which refer to the processes themselves, and which are analogous to photography instead.

Filmographies are not limited to associations with particular people. For example, the Handbook of American Film Genres (1988) includes "19 substantive essays on major American film genres", each accompanied by a "valuable selected filmography." In 1998, the University of Washington sponsored a university-wide "All Powers Project" which assembled a filmography of films related to the Cold War Red Scare, which consisted of "motion pictures that played a role in fueling the Red Scare, in propagandizing the threat of Communism and in a few rare and rather veiled cases, in standing up to the charges of the House Committee on Un-American Activities."

Another example is the filmography published by a library director at Brigham Young University–Idaho of over 500 films "that in some significant or memorable way include a library or librarian", a filmography assembled to better understand Hollywood's stereotypes of librarians. The Georgia Department of Economic Development, whose responsibilities include promoting film production in the U.S. state of Georgia, maintains a filmography of such films.

References

Further reading
 Gebauer, Dorothea and Harriet W. Harrison. Bibliography of National Filmographies. Brussels: FIAF, 1985 80p.
 Summers, Howard. The Guide To Movie Lists: Filmographies of the World. Borehamwood: Howcom Services, 2018  401p.
 Summers, Howard. The Guide To Movie Lists 2: Genres, Subjects and Themes. Borehamwood: Howcom Services, 2018  418p.
 Summers, Howard. The Guide To Movie Lists 3: Appendices. Borehamwood: Howcom Services, 2018  116p.

External links

 Filmographies Of The World
 Filmographies growth through vlogging
 Filmographies is the art of finding perfect filming studios and unique spots